Geir Adelsten Iversen  (born 20 September 1954) is a Norwegian politician. 
He was elected representative to the Storting for the period 2017–2021 for the Centre Party.

References

1954 births
Living people
Centre Party (Norway) politicians
Members of the Storting
Finnmark politicians